In music, Op. 87 stands for Opus number 87. Compositions that are assigned this number include:

 Brahms – Piano Trio No. 2
 Dvořák – Piano Quartet No. 2
 Elgar – The Severn Suite
 Fauré – Le Plus doux chemin
 Mendelssohn – String Quintet No. 2
 Prokofiev – Cinderella
 Rautavaara – String Quartet No. 4
 Ries – Flute Sonata No. 4
 Schumann – Ballad, "Der Handschuh" (Schiller)
 Shostakovich – 24 Preludes and Fugues